Black Hills Airport  (Clyde Ice Field) is a public airport three miles (5 km) east of Spearfish, in Lawrence County, South Dakota.

Western Airlines served Spearfish from 1949-50 until 1959.

Facilities
It has three grass runways: 8/26 is 3,975 x 100 ft (1,212 x 30 m), 17/35 is 3,900 x 150 ft (1,189 x 46 m) and 4/22 is 2,023 x 150 ft (617 x 46 m).

In the year ending May 16, 2007 the airport had 25,600 aircraft operations, average 70 per day: 94% general aviation, 6% air taxi and <1% military. 78 aircraft were then based at this airport: 87% single-engine, 9% multi-engine and 4% ultralight.

References

External links 
Lawrence County Airport Board - Black Hills Airport

Airports in South Dakota
Buildings and structures in Lawrence County, South Dakota
Transportation in Lawrence County, South Dakota
Spearfish, South Dakota